is an international airport located  south southwest of Aomori Station in Aomori, the capital city of Aomori Prefecture in northern Japan. The airport has international service within East Asia in addition to several domestic routes and serves as an international gateway to northern Tōhoku. In 2018, the airport was the 27th-busiest in Japan by passenger traffic.

History
Permission to build Aomori Airport was granted by the Ministry of Transport on 1 September 1962. Construction of the airport was completed in August 1964 and the first Aomori Airport was opened on 5 November 1964, in the town of Namioka that has since been annexed by the city of Aomori, with a single 1200 x 30 meter runway designed for use with the NAMC YS-11 aircraft. The airport was located at an altitude of 200 meters in a valley surrounded by mountains, which hampered operations during inclement weather. The runway was lengthened to 1350 meters in 1971, widened to 45 meters in 1972, and extended to 1400 meters in 1973. The terminal building was expanded in 1974, and again in 1978.

Due to the geographic limitations of the existing site, design work began to shift the position of the airport to its present location southwest of downtown Aomori, much of the land occupied by the old airport still lies within the northeastern premises of the current airport - roughly along the apron designated for light aircraft. The new facilities opened in 1987 with a single 2000 x 60 meter runway, with an ILS system. The runway was extended to 2500 meters in 1990. In 1995, the airport terminal building was remodeled, and certified as suitable for international operations.

The runway was extended to 3,000 meters in 2005, and the instrument landing system upgraded to handle Cat-3a fog conditions in 2007. The Tōhoku Shinkansen high-speed rail line was extended to Aomori in 2010, adding intense competition on the Aomori–Tokyo route. The government of Aomori Prefecture considered the privatization of the airport in 2012 following a study; however, as of 2019 the airport is still managed by the prefecture. After an increase in passenger traffic and the announcement of increased international services, the terminal was renovated in 2019. The renovation included increased capacity for international customers, the addition of prayer facilities for Muslim travelers, and aesthetic updates to the appearance of the entire terminal building.

Historical airline service
The first scheduled air service to and from Aomori Airport began on 1 June 1965, with Toa Airways - which would later be known as Japan Air System (JAS) - servicing Haneda Airport by NAMC YS-11 turboprop aircraft. All Nippon Airways (ANA) began operations to Tokyo in 1994. In the following year, Korean Air began operations to Seoul and Siberian Airlines to Khabarovsk when the airport was certified for international operations. In 1998, Air Nippon began operations to Sendai Airport. However, usage of Aomori Airport fell short of projections, and the service was canceled after a year. In April 2003, ANA withdrew from operations at Aomori as well, turning its routes over to Skymark Airlines, which in turn ceased operations to Aomori from November of the same year. Siberian Airlines stopped its flights to Aomori in 2004.

Following the merger of JAS and Japan Airlines in 2006, the Aomori–Tokyo route and other services run by JAS were handed over to Japan Airlines. ANA resumed services at Aomori Airport on 1 July 2014 with flights to and from Osaka–Itami and Sapporo–Chitose. On 17 July 2019, EVA Air began operating two flights per week between Aomori and Taoyuan International Airport.

Facilities

Runways

Aomori Airport has one  runway that is aligned in a northeast to southwest heading. The runway gets covered in an average  of snow annually. The 38-vehicle White Impulse snow removal crew gets rid of the snow covering the airport's runway, taxiway, and apron; an area covering , in 40 minutes.

Ground transportation
The toll road connects the airport to central Aomori to the northeast and Hirosaki to the southwest. The western end of the toll road lies close to Namioka Interchange (exit 53) on the cross-country Tōhoku Expressway. The airport is serviced by scheduled bus service to central Aomori and Hirosaki; taxis and rental cars are also available.

Airlines and destinations

Statistics

Annual traffic

Incidents
 Two United States Air Force F-16 Falcon fighter jets on a training flight from nearby Misawa Air Base made an emergency landing at Aomori Airport on 26 April 2010 due to engine troubles. 
 In a similar incident several years later, two F-16s from Misawa made an emergency landing at Aomori Airport on 15 April 2015 due to an engine oil leak on one of the aircraft; Aomori Governor Shingo Mimura demanded that the U.S. military take measures to prevent a recurrence.

References

External links

 Aomori Airport Building Co. Ltd.
 Aomori Airport Administration Office
 
 

Airports in Japan
Transport in Aomori (city)
Buildings and structures in Aomori (city)
1964 establishments in Japan
Airports established in 1964